Get a Load of This may refer to: 

 Get a Load of This (short story collection), a 1942 book by James Hadley Chase
 Get a Load of This (album), a 2005 album by Slunt
 Get a Load of This, a 1941 stage musical by Manning Sherwin
 "Get a Load of This", a 1925 song composed by Harry Archer
 "Get a Load of This", a 1974 song by R. Crumb & His Cheap Suit Serenaders